Festival Cinemas was founded in 1978 in Vancouver, British Columbia. The purpose of Festival was to show Canadian specialty art and other high quality films.

The two theatres currently comprising the Festival chain in Vancouver are the Fifth Avenue Cinemas and the Park Theatre. A third, the Ridge Theatre, closed its doors on February 3, 2013, and is being converted into condominiums.

On February 15, 2013, it was announced that the remaining two theatres would be sold to Cineplex Entertainment, effective March 1, 2013.

References

External links
 Festival Cinemas Website

Movie theatre chains in Canada
Former cinemas in Canada
Cinemas and movie theatres in Vancouver
Mass media companies established in 1978
Mass media companies disestablished in 2013